The 30th RTHK Top 10 Gold Songs Awards was held on January 19, 2008 at the Hong Kong Coliseum for the 2007 music season.

Top 10 song awards
The top 10 songs (十大中文金曲) of 2008 are as follows.

Other awards

References
 Taikung news RTHK top 10 gold song awards 2008

RTHK Top 10 Gold Songs Awards
2008 in Hong Kong
2008 music awards